Calexit is a 2017 speculative fiction comic book written by Matteo Pizzolo, illustrated by Amancay Nahuelpan, and published by Black Mask Studios.

Publication 
Black Mask put out three issues of Calexit from July 2017 to May 2018, followed by a trade paperback collection published in June 2018.

Plot 
Following an order from the United States federal government to deport all immigrants, California declares itself a sanctuary state, triggering a military intervention by the federal government plunging the state into chaos. The series follows Jamil, a smuggler, and Zora, a resistance leader, who escape together from a detention facility in Occupied Los Angeles.

Reception 
Calexit sold out its first print run of 25,000 copies. It received positive reviews from io9, Boing Boing and Newsarama.

References 

American comics
2017 comics debuts
Comics set in California
Dystopian comics